Mappin & Webb (M&W) is an international jewellery company headquartered in England. It now has retail stores throughout the UK.

Mappin & Webb has held Royal Warrants to British monarchs since 1897.  The company's master craftsman Mark Appleby is the current Crown Jeweller of the United Kingdom.

History
Mappin & Webb traces its origins to 1775, when Jonathan Mappin opened a silver workshop in Sheffield, then as now a major centre of the English silver trade.  The business eventually became Mappin Brothers.

One of Jonathan Mappin's great-grandsons, John Mappin, started his own business in London, Mappin & Company, in 1860, which became Mappin, Webb & Co. in 1862 after John Mappin was joined by his brother-in-law George Webb.  The first Mappin & Webb store opened in 1860 at 77–78 Oxford Street, London, and the company's candelabras, fine silverware, and vanity products swiftly gained renown.  As a natural progression from silverware, Mappin & Webb began designing jewellery.  Mappin, Webb & Co. acquired Mappin Brothers in 1903. Three years later the premises on Oxford Street were rebuilt to designs by Belcher & Joass. Joass also rebuilt the Regent Street store (inherited from Mappin Brothers), in 1914. By the 1950s the latter store was proving more successful than the former, and in 1956 the company moved its headquarters from Oxford Street to Regent Street.

Mappin & Webb expanded internationally beginning in the 1890s.  Its first overseas store was established in Johannesburg, and stores soon followed in Buenos Aires, Sao Paulo, Biarritz, Hong Kong, Shanghai, Cairo, and Bombay. However, the family lost control of the business in the 1950s, when it was the subject of a hostile takeover (through the acquisition of privately owned shares). Subsequently, all international stores closed in the second half of the 20th century. Since then, it has changed ownership many times.

Mappin & Webb has created jewellery for royalty and high society; both in the United Kingdom, and internationally.  Patrons have included Queen of France Marie-Antoinette, the Empress of Russia, and Princess Grace of Monaco.  The company historically held Royal Warrants to both the Russian Empire and the Japanese Royal Household.  Queen Victoria was the first British monarch to commission Mappin & Webb. Victoria's Golden Jubilee necklace was created by the house in 1888, and was designated by the Queen as an heirloom of the Crown.  Mappin & Webb has held Royal Warrants in the UK since 1897. Today, Mappin & Webb holds warrants to both Queen Elizabeth II, and the Prince of Wales. Mappin & Webb's master craftsman Martin Swift was appointed in 2012 to the position of Crown Jeweller, the custodian of the British Crown Jewels who is responsible for preparing them for the State Opening of Parliament and other state occasions. Mark Appleby, also of Mappin & Webb, took over as crown jeweller in 2017.

Mappin & Webb produced the original Ryder Cup trophy, and made trophies for the Royal Ascot horse races for 75 years.

Ownership

Mappin & Webb merged with Elkington and Walker & Hall in 1963, the merged company being named British Silverware Ltd.  In 1973, Mappin & Webb was bought by Sears Holdings Ltd. The company was eventually bought by Baugur, which became insolvent in 2010.  After a brief spell in the Asprey Garrard group, the company now forms part of the retail group Watches of Switzerland, formerly Aurum Holdings.  The Mappin & Webb company floated on the London Stock Exchange (LSE) in 2019. Mappin & Webb continues to produce silverware and jewellery collections, and is a retailer of luxury timepieces in its boutiques, including timepieces from Swiss watch houses Rolex, Jaeger-LeCoultre, Patek Philippe, and Omega.

Bank branch

A branch of Mappin & Webb once occupied a prominent location in the City of London at the junction of Poultry and Queen Victoria Street, adjacent to Bank junction.  Designed in the neo-gothic style by John Belcher in 1870, the listed building was demolished in 1994 to make way for the construction of a postmodern office and retail building, No 1 Poultry, despite a fiercely fought campaign to save the 19th century building.

Cultural references
In the Jules Dassin classic film noir production Rififi of 1955, a gang execute a brilliant but ill-fated heist on a Mappin & Webb jewellery store in Paris.

References

Further reading

External links

Mappin & Webb — official website

British jewellers
Manufacturing companies of England
English goldsmiths
English silversmiths
British Royal Warrant holders